Palazzo Cavalli-Franchetti is a palace in Venice, Italy, not far from the Ponte dell'Accademia and next to the Palazzo Barbaro on the Grand Canal of Venice.  Since 1999 it has been the seat of the Istituto Veneto di Scienze, Lettere ed Arti and frequently houses cultural events.

History
The palace was erected in 1565. In the 19th century it was internally modernised and externally enriched in Venetian Gothic style, with rich window framing, by a series of grand owners.  The first neo-Gothic improvements were made after 1840, when the young Archduke Frederick Ferdinand of Austria (1821–1847) reassembled the property, the Palazzo Cavalli-Gussoni, which had become divided among heirs, and embarked on a complex project intended to give a more prominent Habsburg presence along the Grand Canal, as Austria-Hungary had been awarded the territories of Venice after the Napoleonic Wars. At his premature death, unmarried, in 1847 the palazzo was bought by Henri, comte de Chambord, styled "Henri V" by Bourbon legitimists, who entrusted further restorations to Giambattista Meduna; his portrait on the balcony, with Santa Maria Della Salute in the background, is in the Ducal Palace of Modena.

In 1878, Baron Raimondo Franchetti (1829–1905), who had married Sarah Luisa de Rothschild (1834–1924), daughter of Anselm Salomon Rothschild of the Vienna Rothschilds, bought the palazzo and commissioned further works by architect Camillo Boito, who constructed the grand staircase. In September 1922, it was sold to the Istituto Federale di Credito per il Risorgimento delle Venezie by Franchetti's widow.

See also
Palazzo Cavalli

Notes

External links
Istituto Veneto di Scienze, Lettere ed Arti website
Palazzo Cavalli-Franchetti website
Palazzo Cavalli-Franchetti history by Giandomenico Romanelli

Houses completed in 1565
Cavalli-Franchetti
Cavalli-Franchetti
Gothic architecture in Venice
Venetian Gothic architecture
Gothic Revival architecture in Italy
1565 establishments in the Republic of Venice